Tobias Warschewski (born 6 February 1998) is a German professional footballer who plays as a forward.

Club career
Warschewski played for Preußen Münster in the 2016–17, 2017–18, and 2018–19 seasons where he scored five goals in 46 3. Liga appearances.

On 21 July 2020, Warschewski signed with Regionalliga Nord side Phönix Lübeck. On 23 September 2020, he made his debut as a 73rd-minute substitute and scored his first goal for the club in a 3–0 win over Heider SV. He went on to make another four appearances for Phönix that season, for a total of one goal in five appearances.

On 19 February 2021, Warschewski signed a one-year contract with Canadian Premier League side FC Edmonton. He scored his first goal for Edmonton on 31 July against Valour FC, netting the second goal in a 3–1 victory. Warschewski was one of the few bright spots in a disappointing season for FC Edmonton, as he finished the season with the most assists in the league, with 7, even as Edmonton finished in seventh place. On 9 February 2022, the club announced that Warschewski and all but two other players would not be returning for the 2022 season.

In February 2022, Warschewski signed a one-year deal with an optional extension with York United, and was then immediately loaned back to FC Edmonton. 2022 was expected to be a very difficult season for Edmonton, with financial issues drastically affecting the club. However, Warchewski was expected to play a major role for the side. In their first match of the 2022 season, he scored an incredible bicycle kick in the final seconds to ensure a 1-1 draw against Valour FC. In December 2022, York announced Warschewski would be departing the club.

International career
In March 2017, Warschewski played for Germany's U-19 team in UEFA European Under-19 Championship qualifying, making his debut as a substitute against Cyprus. He was subsequently called up for the final tournament that July, where he made a substitute appearance against the Netherlands and then appeared as a substitute again against England, scoring a consolation goal in a 4–1 loss.

Career statistics

References

External links
 
 
 

1998 births
Living people
Association football forwards
German footballers
Germany youth international footballers
Footballers from Dortmund
SC Preußen Münster players
1. FC Phönix Lübeck players
FC Edmonton players
York United FC players
3. Liga players
Regionalliga players
Canadian Premier League players
German expatriate footballers
Expatriate soccer players in Canada
German expatriate sportspeople in Canada